The Salmankaş Tunnel is a road tunnel under construction located on the province border of Gümüşhane and Bayburt connecting the provincial roads  and  on the route from Araklı, Trabzon via Dağbaşı, Trabzon to Uğrak, Bayburt in northeastern Turkey.

Situated on the Mount Salmankaş of Pontic Mountains, it is a -long twin-tube tunnel. The cost of the construction, which is carried out by as-yol Yapı A.Ş., is estimated to be 170 million.

It was built to bypass the Salmankaş Pass at  elevation, which is on the ancient Silk Road, with extremely steep incline and to alleviate Black Sea Region's access to Eastern Anatolia Region. The tunnel will also eliminate the six-month-long traffic inaccessibility during the winter months due to harsh climatic conditions by heavy snow fall, icing and fog. It will shorten the route about  resulting in a travel time reduction from 2–3.5 hours to 1.5 hours.

The groundbreaking ceremony was held in presence of Minister of Transport, Maritime and Communication Binali Yıldırım on 23 August 2012. For the construction of the tunnel the New Austrian Tunnelling method (NATM) is being applied. The breakthrough in the tunnel was achieved on 24 November 2013.

The tunnel was opened to traffic on December 20, 2019.

References

Road tunnels in Turkey
Transport in Gümüşhane Province
Transport in Bayburt Province
Transport infrastructure under construction in Turkey